John David Leigh II  (November 8, 1948 – May 19, 2004) was an American photographer and author, known for the cover photograph on John Berendt's novel Midnight in the Garden of Good and Evil. The photograph featured the Bird Girl statue from Bonaventure Cemetery in Savannah, Georgia, where he is now buried.

Leigh was a native of Savannah, and a graduate of the Savannah Country Day School and the University of Georgia. Already well known locally as a portrait and documentary photographer, Leigh was commissioned by Random House for the photograph. Leigh wrote and published five books on photography. His former photo gallery was a popular tourist attraction in the historic district of downtown Savannah. 

Leigh died May 19, 2004, in Savannah, of colon cancer.

Published works
 Oystering: A Way of Life ( with James Dickey and Charles L. Wyrick, Jr.; Carolina Art Association, June 1983)
 Nets & Doors: Shrimping in Southern Waters (Gibbs Smith Publishing, October 1, 1989)
 Seaport: A Waterfront at Work (Gibbs Smith Publishing, July 1, 1996)
 The Land I'm Bound To Photographs (with Pat Conroy; W.W. Norton & Company, Sept 2000)
 The Ogeechee: A River and Its People (Wormsloe Foundation Publications, April 28, 2004)
 Ossabaw: Evocations of an Island (with James Kilgo, Alan Campbell, and John Lane; University of Georgia Press, April 28, 2004)

References

External links
 The Land He's Bound To by John English
 Jack Leigh Collection Hargrett Rare Books and Manuscript Library

1948 births
2004 deaths
20th-century American photographers
Writers from Savannah, Georgia
University of Georgia alumni
Deaths from colorectal cancer
Deaths from cancer in Georgia (U.S. state)